Kandahar is a city in Afghanistan.

Kandahar or variant spellings may refer to:

Places

Afghanistan
 Kandahar 
 Kandahar District
 Kandahar Province
 Principality of Qandahar
Old Kandahar
 Kandahar International Airport, in Kandahar, Afghanistan
 Kandahar University, in Kandahar, Afghanistan

Azerbaijan
 Cəndəhar (also Çəndahar and Chandakhar)
 Çandahar (also Çandaxar, Chandakhar, and Ğəndahar)

Canada
 Kandahar, Saskatchewan

India
 Kandhar, city in Nanded, Maharashtra
 Kandhar taluka, sub-district of Maharashtra
 Kandhar Fort, fort in the city

Iran
 Kaneh Har, Kermanshah Province
 Kandeh-ye Har, Kermanshah Province

Films
 Kandahar (2001 film), an Iranian film
 Kandahar (2010 film), a Malayalam-language Indian war film
 Kandahar (2023 film), an upcoming American action thriller film
 Kandagar (2010 film), a Russian film based on the 1995 Airstan incident

Sport
 Kandahar (ski course), classic ski World Cup downhill 
 Arlberg-Kandahar, annual alpine skiing event

Other uses
 HMS Kandahar (F28), a Royal Navy destroyer 1939–41
 Kandahar, a meteorite fall in 1959
 Kandahar, a ski run in Garmisch-Partenkirchen, Germany
 Kandahar, a ski run in Les Houches, France
 Adnan Kandhar or Khandhar (born 1986), Pakistani music video director

See also 
 
 
 Kandahari (disambiguation)
 Gandahar (disambiguation)
 Gāndhārī (disambiguation)
 Alexandria (disambiguation)
 Alessandria (disambiguation)
 Arlberg-Kandahar alpine skiing event
 Kandahar Five, a group of men held prisoner in Kandahar